The National Democratic Party was a Salvadoran political party that existed from 1913 to 1931. The party held power from 1913 to 1931 in a time period of El Salvador known as the Meléndez–Quiñónez dynasty. El Salvador was called a "coffee republic" during the reign of the PND due to the country's heavy reliance on coffee exports. The party ruled as the country's sole political party.

The party did not participate in the 1931 general election since President Pío Romero Bosque did not designate a successor like his predecessors had done. The party was dissolved following the 1931 coup d'état when all political parties where banned.

Electoral history

Presidential elections

Legislative Assembly elections

PND Presidents of El Salvador

Timeline

See also 

Meléndez–Quiñónez dynasty
Fourteen Families
Coffee production in El Salvador

References 

1910s establishments in El Salvador
1930s disestablishments in El Salvador
Parties of one-party systems
Defunct political parties in El Salvador
Political parties established in 1919
Political parties disestablished in 1931
Banned political parties